Camelback Mountain is a mountain in Phoenix, Arizona, United States. The English name is derived from its shape, which resembles the hump and head of a kneeling camel. The mountain, a prominent landmark of the Phoenix metropolitan area, is located in the Camelback Mountain Echo Canyon Recreation Area between the Arcadia neighborhood of Phoenix and the town of Paradise Valley. It is a popular recreation destination for hiking and rock climbing.

History
A cave discovered on the north side of Camelback Mountain indicates that it was used as a sacred site by the prehistoric Hohokam culture before they abandoned the area in the 14th century.

In January 1879, United States President Rutherford B. Hayes included Camelback Mountain as part of a one million acre (4,000 km2) reservation for the Salt River Pima and Maricopa American Indian tribes. Six months later, at the behest of Charles Poston, the Arizona Territorial Legislature reversed the decision in order to ensure the primacy of the 5000 non-Indian area residents as well as their continued access to Salt River water.

Efforts to protect Camelback Mountain as a natural preserve began in the early 1910s. However, by the 1960s, nearly all of the area had been sold to private interests. Federal and state authorities attempted to stop development above the one thousand and six hundred feet level. They failed to halt development and in 1963 efforts to arrange a land exchange failed in the Arizona State legislature. In 1965, United States Senator Barry Goldwater took up the cause and helped to secure the higher elevations against development. The area became a Phoenix city park in 1968.

It starts again past the White Tanks.

Camelback Mountain is designated as a Phoenix Point of Pride.

Geology
The mountain is composed of a geologic unconformity between two separate rock formations. The higher part of the peak is Precambrian granite (ca. 1.5 billion years old).  The head of the camel is predominantly red sedimentary sandstone from the Chattian stage of the Oligocene epoch (ca. 25 million years old).

Recreation
Two hiking trails ascend  to the peak of Camelback Mountain.  The Echo Canyon Trail is 1.14 miles (1900 m)  and the Cholla Trail is 1.4 mi (2300 m).  Both trails are considered strenuous with steep grades. The hiking path has dirt, gravel, boulders, and some handrail-assisted sections. The average hike requires a round trip time of 1.5 to 3 hours.

The Praying Monk is a red sandstone rock formation which is used for rock climbing. Located on the northern slope, the formation resembles the silhouette of a person kneeling in prayer. It rises approximately 100 feet (30 m) and the eastern face has several permanent anchor bolts for attaching a belay rope.

Gallery

See also

 List of historic properties in Phoenix, Arizona

References

External links

 Camelback Mountain. City of Phoenix official website.
 Camelback Mountain hiking information. ClimbCamelback.com.
 Echo Canyon trail description, GPS track, photos, trip logs and more. HikeArizona.com.
 Cholla trail description, GPS track, photos, trip logs and more. HikeArizona.com.
 Trailhead information, directions, photos, tips, history, wildlife and more. HikeCamelback.com.

Mountains of Arizona
Geography of Phoenix, Arizona
Phoenix Points of Pride
Landforms of Maricopa County, Arizona
Parks in Phoenix, Arizona
Mountains of Maricopa County, Arizona